Game & Watch Gallery 2 is a game developed by TOSE and released by Nintendo for the Game Boy in 1997 and the Game Boy Color in 1998. It is the third game in the Game & Watch Gallery series, containing six remastered games from the Game & Watch line of Nintendo handheld games.

Gameplay

Game & Watch Gallery 2 features six games based upon the Game & Watch brand of handheld games. Each game contains a 'Classic' mode, resembling the gameplay and presentation of the original Game & Watch title, and a 'Modern' mode, which contains revised graphics and additional features. For every 200 points players accrue in each game, they earn 'stars' which can be used to unlock additional features, entries in an in-game gallery displaying animations of other Game & Watch titles, and a sixth game, Ball; up to five stars can be earned in each mode and difficulty of each game, for a total of 120 stars.

 Ball: The player juggles two to three balls in the air, requiring the player to catch and toss them up again, with one point earned for each successful catch. In the 'Modern' version, Bob-Ombs will also sometimes appear, which the player must avoid catching; multiple playable characters can also be unlocked.

 Chef: The player moves left and right to catch food in their frying pan to toss up into the air. In the 'Modern' version, the player can rotate and turn on the spot to feed Yoshi. 

 Donkey Kong: The player moves left and right and jumps to avoid barrels, making their way up platforms and ladders towards Donkey Kong. In the 'Modern' version, platforms disappear and levels change for greater variation. 

 Helmet: The player moves left and right to avoid tools falling from the sky, making their way between two doors, with a point awarded for every journey. In the 'Modern' version, a button on the floor occasionally appears, awarding coins for bonus points if stomped upon. 

 Parachute: The player controls a boat, and must collect parachutists before they fall into shark-infested waters, in which case a life is lost. In the 'Modern' version, parachutists sometimes land in a cannon to be shot back into the sky. 

 Vermin: The player moves left and right to hit moles with a hammer as they appear out of ground. In the 'Modern' version, the player controls Yoshi, who can also move up and down, and must guard eggs from vermin that come from all sides.

Reception

Game & Watch Gallery 2 received positive reviews. Dexter Sy of IGN praised the Game Boy Color version of the game as featuring "amazing color graphics, smooth animation and characters", stating that the "uncomplicated" scope of the Game & Watch titles was a "breath of fresh air", whilst noting the "significant twists" added by the new features in the game. Total Game Boy concurred, stating that Game & Watch Gallery 2 was "an essential purchase for your Game Boy Color, stating that the game "is perfect for those 'quick fix' gaming sessions, and the choice of five separate games means that there's plenty of variety". Ty Kris of Nintendojo also praised the game, stating that it "more than does the original Game & Watch games justice, finding that the game had a "ton of replay value" and finding most games "enjoyable and rewarding". In contrast to the unanimously positive reviews, Adam Waring of Planet Game Boy provided a mixed assessment of the game, stating "graphically, it's slick and snazzy, but gameplay wise even the modern games are still very basic and get tiresome quickly", finding that "ultimately the games are too simplistic and samey to keep your attention for long."

References

External links

Game Boy games
Game Boy Color games
1997 video games
Video game remakes
Nintendo video game compilations
Video games developed in Japan
Virtual Console games for Nintendo 3DS
Game & Watch
Tose (company) games
Single-player video games